M&M's (stylized as m&m's) are multi-colored button-shaped chocolates, each of which has the letter "m" printed in lower case in white on one side, consisting of a candy shell surrounding a filling which varies depending upon the variety of M&M's. The original candy has a semi-sweet chocolate filling which, upon introduction of other variations, was branded as the "plain, normal" variety. Peanut M&M's, which feature a peanut coated in milk chocolate, and finally a candy shell, were the first variation to be introduced, and they remain a regular variety. Numerous other variations have been introduced, some of which are regular widespread varieties (peanut butter, almond, pretzel, crispy, dark chocolate, and caramel) while others are limited in duration or geographic availability. M&M's are the flagship product of the Mars Wrigley Confectionery division of Mars, Incorporated.

The candy originated in the United States in 1941, and M&M's have been sold in over 100 countries since 2003. They are produced in different colors, some of which have changed over the years. The candy-coated chocolate concept was inspired by a method used to allow soldiers in the Spanish Civil War (1936–1939) to carry chocolate in warm climates without it melting. The company's longest-lasting slogan reflects this: "the milk chocolate that melts in your mouth, not in your hand." A traditional milk chocolate M&M weighs about 0.91 grams / 0.032 ounces and has about 4.7 calories (kcal) of food energy (1.7 kcal from fat). Despite common belief, each colored M&M does not have a different flavor and all possess the same chocolate taste.

History

1940–70s: Beginnings

Forrest Mars Sr., son of the Mars Company founder, Frank C. Mars, copied the idea for the candy in the 1930s during the Spanish Civil War when he saw soldiers eating British-made Smarties, chocolate pellets with a colored shell of what confectioners call hard panning (essentially hardened sugar syrup) surrounding the outside, preventing the sweets (candies) from melting. Mars received a patent for his own process on March 3, 1941. Production began in 1941 in a factory located at 285 Badger Avenue in Clinton Hill, Newark, New Jersey. When the company was founded it was M&M Limited. The two 'M's represent the names of Forrest E. Mars Sr., the founder of Newark Company, and Bruce Murrie, son of Hershey Chocolate's president William F. R. Murrie, who had a 20 percent share in the product. The arrangement allowed the candies to be made with Hershey chocolate, as Hershey had control of the rationed chocolate at the time.

The company's first big customer was the U.S. Army, which saw the invention as a way to allow soldiers to carry chocolate in tropical climates without it melting. During World War II, the candies were exclusively sold to the military. The resulting demand for the candies caused an increase in production and the company moved its factory to bigger quarters at 200 North 12th Street in Newark, New Jersey, where it remained until 1958 when it moved to a bigger factory at Hackettstown. A second factory was opened in Cleveland, Tennessee, in 1978. Today, about half of the production of M&M's occurs at the New Jersey factory, and half at the Tennessee factory.
In 1949, the brand introduced the tagline "The milk chocolate that melts in your mouth, not in your hand."

In 1950, a black "M" was imprinted on the candies giving them a unique trademark. It was changed to white in 1954.

In the early 1950s, the Midwest Research Institute (now MRIGlobal) in Kansas City, Missouri, worked on behalf of M&M's to perfect a process whereby  of chocolate centers could be coated every hour.

Peanut M&M's were introduced in 1954 but first appeared only in the color tan. In 1960, M&M's added the yellow, red, and green colors.

In 1976, the color orange was added to the mix to replace red, which was discontinued in response to the "red dye scare" over Red Dyes #2 and #4 having been evaluated to be carcinogenic in nature. Although M&M's were made with the less controversial Red Dye #40, the public was wary of any food being dyed red. Red M&M's were re-introduced in 1987.

1980s: Expanding internationally
In the 1980s, M&M's were introduced internationally to Australia, Canada, Europe, Hong Kong, Japan, Malaysia, and the United Kingdom.

M&Ms Royals were marketed in the early 1980s with an advertising campaign that said: "Now chocolate's got a whisper of mint." They were colored pale green or brown and showed a crown rather than an M&Ms logo.

Although they were marketed and then withdrawn in the 1960s, almond-centred M&M's were available again in 1988 in limited release, with appearances only during Christmas and Easter times; they became a standard part of the product line in 1992.

Also in 1986, M&M's launched Holidays Chocolate Candies for Easter and Christmas, with the Easter candies having a bunny, chick, and egg symbols on pastel-colored shells, and the Christmas candies having pine tree, bell, and candle symbols on red and green shells; with the latter also having a special mint flavor. By 1993, the holiday symbols were replaced with the standard trademark "M".

1990s: New flavors ring
In 1991, Peanut Butter M&M's were released. These candies have peanut butter inside the chocolate shell and the same color scheme as the other varieties. As of at least 2013, the size of the peanut butter M&M has become slightly smaller. In 1995, tan M&Ms were discontinued to be replaced by blue. To introduce the new color, the Home Shopping Network televised a promotional video for the blue M&M. Producer Jon Watson became the first man to wear the famous blue M&M suit.

During the 1990s, Europe first began to adopt the M&M's brand name, replacing existing products. Two of these were known as "Treats" and "Bonitos." In 1996, Mars introduced "M&M's Minis", smaller candies usually sold in plastic tubes instead of bags. In 1999, Crispy M&M's were released. They were slightly larger than the milk chocolate variety and also featured a crispy wafer center. Crispy M&M's were discontinued in the United States in 2005, before being reintroduced in 2015; however, they remained continually available in Europe and Australia.

2000s–present: New flavors and re-releases
In July 2001, dulce de leche M&M's were introduced in five markets with large Hispanic populations: Los Angeles, California; San Diego, California; Miami, Florida; McAllen-Brownsville, Texas; and San Antonio, Texas. The flavor never became popular with the Hispanic community, who preferred existing M&M's flavors, and it was discontinued in most areas by early 2003.

Several other flavors of M&M debuted throughout the 2010s. These include Pretzel M&M's, released in 2010; Coffee Nut M&M's, released in 2016; Caramel M&M's, released in 2017; English Toffee M&M's, released in 2019; and Hazelnut Spread M&M's, also released in 2019.

A range of additional products were launched in the 2000s and 2010s to expand beyond the traditional line of candies. A chocolate bar called the M-Azing was initially released in 2004, and subsequently relaunched in 2013; Oversized candies titled "Mega M&M's" were briefly released in 2007 to promote the Shrek film series, before being introduced as a standalone product in 2014; M&M cookies began to be sold in the United States in 2016; and M&M chocolate blocks were released in Australia in 2017.

In 2020, Fudge Brownie M&M's were released in the United States.

On September 28, 2022, the introduction of purple M&M's were announced, as well as their newest spokescandy, Purple.

Marketing
Over the years, marketing has helped build and expand the M&M's brand. Computer-animated graphics, personification of the candies as characters with cartoon-like storytelling, and various merchandising techniques including the introduction of new flavors, colors and customizable merchandise have helped to increase the brand's recognition as a candy icon.

In 1982, the Mars candy bar company rejected the inclusion of M&M's in the new Steven Spielberg film E.T. the Extra-Terrestrial. However, competitor Hershey took a chance with their Reese's Pieces, which is similar to M&M's but contains a peanut butter filling. With the film's blockbuster success, Reese's Pieces sales dramatically increased, perhaps by as much as 300%.

Marketing campaigns
Between 1982 and 1987, its slogan was "All the World Loves M&M's", accompanied by a TV jingle of the same name. Actor Joel Higgins, then co-starring in the NBC-TV sitcom Silver Spoons, co-wrote the song.

In 1990, M&M's exhibited at New York's Erie County Fair a life-size fiberglass cow covered with 66,000 M&M candies—each adhered by hand with the "m" logo on each candy facing outward. According to a website run by the cow's designer, Michael Adams, the stunt earned M&M Mars $1 million in free publicity because it was reported on by Newsweek magazine, as well as the New York Post, UPI and WABC-TV, and Live with Regis.

In 1995, the company ran the M&M's Color Campaign, a contest in which participants were given the choice of selecting purple, blue, or pink as the color of a new variety of M&M's. The announcement of the winning color (blue) was carried on most of the television networks' news programs, as well as the talk shows of David Letterman and Jay Leno. As part of the contest results, the company had the Empire State Building lighted in blue. Although the financial details of these deals were not disclosed and neither was the campaign's effect on sales, one marketing book estimated that the company "collected millions" in free publicity and that the campaign "certainly" resulted in an increasing of the brand's awareness.

In 1996, Mars produced Christmas-themed advertisement for the candies in which the Red and Yellow characters run into Santa Claus on Christmas Eve. Similarly to competitor Hershey's own Christmas-themed commercial, the commercial proved immensely successful and has re-aired every December since that year, becoming their longest-running television commercial.

In 1998, M&M's were styled as "The Official Candy of the New Millennium", as MM is the Roman numeral for 2000. This date was also the release of the rainbow M&M's, which are multi-colored and filled with a variety of different fillings.

In 2000, "Plain" M&M's (a name created in 1954 when "Peanut" M&M's were introduced) were renamed "Milk Chocolate" M&M's, and pictures of the candy pieces were added to the traditional brown and white packaging.

In 2004, M&M's adopted the 1967 Petula Clark song "Colour My World" for its TV ads, albeit using newly recorded versions with other singers.

Joint marketing campaigns
In 1990, Mars Snackfood US signed up to be a sponsor for NASCAR in the NASCAR Cup Series. Drivers for the M&M's-sponsored car through the years have included Ernie Irvan (1999), Ken Schrader (2000–02), Elliott Sadler (2003–06), Ricky Rudd (2007), David Gilliland (2006–07), Kyle Busch (2008–current, won 2015 Sprint Cup Series Championship & 2019 Monster Energy Cup Series Championship), Michael McDowell, Matt Crafton, Erik Jones and David Ragan. 2022 would be Mars final year as Busch’s sponsor. Mars has also sponsored Busch in the Xfinity Series and Craftsman Truck Series along with Busch’s team, Kyle Busch Motorsports. Mars sponsored the 2022 NASCAR Cup Race at Pocono, titled the “M&M’s Fan Appreciation 400”. 

The introduction of the blue M&M to Australia was promoted by the Australian Football League's Carlton Football Club, which wore sky-blue colored guernseys in one of its matches in 1997 instead of its traditional navy blue – a color which the successful and fiercely traditional club had worn since the 1870s. In 2010, Mars Snackfood Australia described it as the most successful promotional campaign it had ever engaged in.

In April 2005, M&M's ran the "mPire" promotion to tie in with the Star Wars: Episode III – Revenge of the Sith film release. M&M's were offered in dark chocolate varieties (regular and Peanut) for the first time after a string of Addams Family M&M's commercials.

In May 2004, M&M's ran a Shrek 2 promotion to tie in with the film's release. M&M's were offered "ogre-sized" (65% larger) in swamp/ogre colors. They were sold at many stores displayed in huge cardboard-cutout ogre displays.

In the summer of 2005, Mars added "Mega M&M's" to the lineup. These candies, at 55% larger than the traditional M&M's, were a little smaller than the ogre-sized version. They were available in Milk Chocolate and Peanut varieties. The colors for Mega M&M's were changed to less-bright colors, ostensibly to appeal to older consumers: teal (replacing green), beige (replacing orange), maroon (replacing red), gold (replacing yellow), blue-gray (replacing blue), and brown.

In July 2006, Dark Chocolate M&M's reappeared in a purple package, followed in 2007 by Dark Chocolate Peanut M&M's. Also in 2006, the company piloted White Chocolate M&M's as a tie-in with their Pirates of the Caribbean promotion. The company also offered eight new flavors of M&M's via online sales, as well as at M&M's World locations: "All That Razz"; "Eat, Drink, & Be Cherry"; "A Day at the Peach"; "Orange-U-Glad"; "Mint Condition"; "AlmonDeeLicious"; "Nut What You Think"; and "Cookie Monster". Mars also released a "Crispy Mint" variety in Australia that year.

Also in 2006, M&M's became the official chocolate of NASCAR.

In 2007, M&M's introduced a limited-edition raspberry flavor called "M&M's Razzberry Chocolate Candies".

Also in 2007, M&M's produced a 50-foot, smiling Lady Liberty M&M statue to kick off a campaign encouraging Americans to create their own M&M characters at mms.com. The website allows for people to log in and create their own character from scratch. They can choose features such as the color, shape, hair, and accessories.

In 2008, two limited-edition varieties of the candy were introduced – "Wildly Cherry" M&M's, and, as a marketing tie-in with the film Indiana Jones and the Kingdom of the Crystal Skull, "Mint Crisp" M&M's.

M&M's also introduced another new product called "M&M's Premiums" in 2008. They come in five flavors – chocolate almond, mint chocolate, mocha, raspberry almond, and triple chocolate (milk, dark, and white chocolate), which are sold in small upright cartons with a plastic bag inside. M&M's Premiums do not have a candy shell, but are coated with carnauba wax and color. Dark chocolate was added in 2009, replacing mocha.

During the summer of 2008, My M&M's launched 'Faces,' which allows consumers to print the faces of loved ones on M&M's chocolate candies at mymms.com.

In February 2009, M&M's launched the "M&M's Colour Break-Up" promotion in Australia, where M&M's were sold in separate packs (one for each color): the packs included a code to win prizes.

In summer 2009, M&M's launched a limited-edition "Strawberried Peanut Butter" variant to tie in with the release of Transformers: Revenge of the Fallen. In addition, M&M's launched a limited edition "Coconut M&M's", which became a permanent item in 2010.

In early 2010, M&M's Bare All were released as part of a competition in Australia and New Zealand. M&M's Bare All winning packs were ordinary M&M's, but without colored shells. An official website was launched, along with television advertisements. In April 2010, M&M's launched a new Pretzel variety. In November 2011, Mars released a limited edition M&M's Cinnamon Milk Chocolate for Christmas.

About the time Pretzel M&M's came out, the M&M's wrapper designs in the US were redone from the design used from 2004 to early 2010.

In 2012, M&M's released two new Dark Chocolate flavors: Raspberry and Mint. Also that year, M&M's released a White Chocolate flavor for the Easter season. From May 30, 2012, onwards, M&M's will be launched in Macau. Its Macanese launch language is Portuguese. In 2012, Peanut M&M's were produced in the UK in a limited edition "Red, White and Blues only" pack, in connection with the country's Diamond Jubilee and 2012 Summer Olympics. The 'M' remains white on the white candies. The commercial advertising this promotional package had Yellow donning various outfits of British stereotypes to try to get into the limited edition pack. Similarly, to promote the 2014 FIFA World Cup in the UK, Peanut M&M's were produced in a pack that contained only green, yellow, and blue candies, to reflect the colors of the flag of Brazil; these were dubbed as limited-edition "Brazilian M&M's" in the accompanying commercial. "Brazilian M&M's" were re-released in 2016 to promote the 2016 Summer Olympics, but were available in both Chocolate and Peanut.

In 2013, M&M's launched the "Better with M" campaign, which included cause-related marketing. The campaign worked with Habitat for Humanity and encouraged fans to use a Facebook app to volunteer at the various sites where the homes were being built. The advertising campaign was one of the largest that Mars had ever executed. The 2013 "America Better With M" initiative sought to provide money directly to Habitat for Humanity through offering limited versions of M&M's in red, white and blue.

Since 1988, specially designed packages of red, white and blue Presidential M&M's have been given as souvenirs to guests of the President of the United States. One side of the box features the presidential seal and the signature of the current president; the other side includes an M&M's character flying the American flag. A common misconception is that every candy is stamped with the presidential seal; however, some U.S. embassies around the world do offer M&M's stamped with the seal of the United States.

M&M's World specialty shops have been established in some locations, including Las Vegas, Orlando, New York, London, and Shanghai.

Several M&Ms-themed video games have been created. The first was M&M's The Lost Formulas, released on September 28, 2000.

Related brands
Related candy brands from Mars include Minstrels, Revels, Skittles, and Treets.

M&M's characters

Early black-and-white adverts for the candy in 1954 featured two talking, anthropomorphic M&M characters—one plain and one peanut—diving into a swimming pool full of chocolate.

The first incarnation of the characters in CGI was a 1994 celebrity campaign which had the characters interacting with celebrities on which M&Ms candy color is their favorite. This campaign was created by Blue Sky Studios. Concurrent with 1995's blue M&M campaign, M&M's introduced second computer-animated "spokescandies" in their television commercials. The depiction and campaign of the M&M's were made by Will Vinton in 1995. Vinton previously created the clay-animated California Raisins in 1986. Around the time he worked on CGI projects, he made the depiction of the M&M's as more mature than most food mascots. These include the team of the cynical and sardonic Red (originally voiced by Jon Lovitz, thereafter Billy West) who is the mascot for milk chocolate, peanut butter, and crispy M&M's, and the happy and gullible Yellow (originally voiced by John Goodman, thereafter J.K. Simmons), who is the mascot for Peanut M&M's (he was originally known as "Peanut" when first introduced). Other mascots include the "cool one", Blue (voiced by Robb Pruitt) who is the mascot for Almond M&M's; the seductive Green (her personality is a reference to the 1970s urban legend that green M&Ms were aphrodisiacs) (voiced by Cree Summer and Larissa Murray), who is the mascot for both Dark Chocolate Mint and Peanut Butter M&M's, and the slightly neurotic Orange (voiced by Eric Kirchberger), who was introduced when Crispy M&M's were first released and returned when Pretzel M&M's debuted in 2010. Orange, upon his return, was joined by the second non-M&M mascot, Pretzel Guy, who "supports" him and offers helpful advice as he hates the idea of having a pretzel put inside his body.

Other mascots that were introduced, but no longer used, are Almond, the original green guy; Orange, a female peanut character; Chocolate Bar (voiced by Phil Hartman), the first non-M&M character that always gets foiled or outdone by Red and Yellow by being melted, as M&M's do not melt; and the Swarmees for M&M's Minis candies, which are portrayed as destructive yet crafty troublemakers whom Red and Yellow are always trying unsuccessfully to contain after they accidentally released them in the product's initial commercial.

Female M&M's mascots were introduced in 1995. Green was the Milk Chocolate mascot and Tan was the Peanut. Marketing discontinued Tan when they introduced the then-new Blue mascot. Green was the only female M&M's mascot from her introduction in 1995 until 2012 when M&M's unveiled a new additional spokescandy, Ms. Brown (voiced by actress Vanessa Williams), the "Chief Chocolate Officer". During a Super Bowl LII advertisement, Red was transformed into a human after finding a lucky penny and wishing that he was inedible. As a human, he is portrayed by Danny DeVito. 

In January 2022, Mars announced plans to alter the design of the M&Ms characters. The company announced that the aim of this change was to make their characters more representative of a broader array of human personalities and personal backgrounds. Among these changes is the adoption of more casual clothing for the Green and Brown M&Ms, both of which are generally interpreted to be female characters. In September 2022 they introduced a new Purple M&M voiced by Amber Ruffin who first appeared in a commercial singing "I'm Just Gonna Be Me". 

Referencing criticism surrounding the changes from conservative media outlets, the company teased a Super Bowl LVII commercial in January 2023 by making a fictitious announcement that the characters were being temporarily retired and replaced by comedian Maya Rudolph. In subsequent teasers leading up to the game, Rudolph was shown hijacking the M&M's brand in her own image, re-launching them as "Ma&Ya's" candy-coated clams. Concurrently, the M&M's characters were depicted as "exploring their outside passions", collaborating with other brands such as Cheddar, eBay, Snickers, Spotify, and Zappos. During the eventual ad for Ma&Ya's, Red makes a cameo during its final scene, holding up a sign reading "Help!" Following the game, M&M's posted a "press conference" confirming the spokescandies had been reinstated.

Color changes

The original colors of M&M's candies were red, yellow, violet, green and brown. Violet was discontinued and replaced with tan in the late 1940s.

In 1976, Mars eliminated red-colored M&M's because of health concerns over the dye amaranth (FD&C Red #2), which was a suspected carcinogen, and replaced them with orange M&M's. This was done despite the fact that M&M's did not contain the dye; the action was purely to satisfy worried consumers. Ten years later, Paul Hethmon, then a student at University of Tennessee, started a joke campaign to reinstate red M&M's that would eventually become a worldwide phenomenon. Red M&M's were reintroduced as a result, and the orange M&M's that had originally replaced them were kept in production. In Europe, red M&M's contain the red dye carmine (E120, cochineal).

In early 1995, Mars ran a promotion in which consumers were invited to vote on which of blue, pink, or purple would replace the tan M&M's. Blue was the winner with 54% of the votes. It replaced tan in late 1995. Consumers could vote by calling 1-800-FUN-COLOR. Ads for the new blue colors featured a plain and an almond blue M&M character as Red and Yellow take notice of trying to do takes in the commercial by painting themselves blue where they appear on stage with B.B. King singing the blues, but the filmmakers had to cut the scene as they were not the real blue M&M's; another featured Red and Yellow holding their breath to look like the new blue M&M's, where Steven Weber sees the three M&M's, Red, Yellow, and Blue; and one more featuring Weber talking to the blue M&M if he had dived into the chocolate pool, but did not.

In 2002, Mars solicited votes in their first ever "M&M's Global Color Vote" to add a new color from three choices: aqua (turquoise), pink, and purple. Purple won and was featured for a limited time. To help the colors get votes, Ken Schrader and his MB2 Motorsports team, who was sponsored by M&M's at the time, ran four paint schemes during the 2002 NASCAR Winston Cup Series season representing the promotion (one for aqua, one for pink, one for purple, and another one with all three colors on the car). Specially marked packages of M&M's were released in Japan. Finding a bag of all purple M&M's entitled the customer to a prize of 100 million yen (equivalent to approximately US$852,000).

Since 2004, M&M's have been available online in 17 colors, with personalized phrases on each candy on the opposite side from the "m". Released around Christmas, these custom-printed M&M's were originally intended for holiday greetings, but are now available all year round.

For the 2008 Valentine's Day season, Mars introduced all-green bags of M&M's. This was due to common urban folklore that says green M&M's are an aphrodisiac. They were brought back for 2009 alongside the "Ms. Green Heats Up Valentine's Day" contest.

In October 2011, Mars released M&M's White Chocolate Candy Corn exclusively in the United States for Halloween. These candies come in three candy corn inspired colors: white, bright yellow, and bright orange.

The following is a summary of the changes to the colors of the flagship (milk chocolate) flavor of M&M's, the only filling manufactured continuously since the beginning of the brand. From 1941 until 1969, each package contained M&M's in five different colors; when red M&M's were reintroduced in 1987, they were added as a sixth color instead of replacing any of the existing colors.

See also

 Cadbury
 Sixlets
 Smarties
 Freia's
 Hershey-ets
 Jelly Belly

References

External links

 
 The History of M&M's Chocolates from us.mms.com

 
Food and drink introduced in 1941
Mars confectionery brands
Candy
Brand name confectionery
1941 establishments in the United States